The 2009 African Rally Championship season was the 29th season of the African Rally Championship. The season consisted of five rallies, beginning on February 20, with the Rally of Tanzania, and ending on August 30 with the conclusion of the Zimbabwe Challenge Rally. Zimbabwe's James Whyte won the championship, winning two of the five rallies during the season.

Calendar

Standings

External links 
Results on official website
Results on FIA website

African Rally Championship
African Rally
Rally